The Socotra Archipelago or Suqutra is officially one of the governorates of Yemen. It is composed of the Guardafui Channel's  archipelago of Socotra.

History 
Since before British rule, Socotra had been part of the Mahra Sultanate, and remained so after Mahra became part of Aden Protectorate. With the independence of South Yemen in 1967, the archipelago was attached to the Aden Governorate, despite its distance. In 2004, it was moved to the Hadhramaut Governorate. Since December 2013, it has been a governorate of its own.

On 30 April 2018, the United Arab Emirates, as a part of the ongoing Yemen Civil War, deployed troops and took administrative control of Socotra Airport and seaport. On 14 May 2018, Saudi troops were also deployed on the island and a deal was brokered between the United Arab Emirates and Yemen for a joint military training exercise and the return of administrative control of Socotra's airport and seaport to Yemen.

The Southern Transitional Council seized control of the island in June 2020.

Islands 
The archipelago consists of four large islands: Socotra, Abd al Kuri, Samhah, and Darsah, as well as 3 small islets to the north of the archipelago.

Districts 
Socotra Governorate is divided into the following 2 districts. These districts are further divided into sub-districts, and then further subdivided into villages:

 Hidaybu District (consisting of the eastern two-thirds of Socotra Island)
 Qulensya wa Abd al Kuri District (consisting of the western third of Socotra Island, together with Abd al Kuri Island, Samhah Island, and (uninhabited) Darsah Island)

References

 
Governorates of Yemen